SureAI is a German team of video game developers, best known for creating several total conversion mods of Bethesda Softworks' The Elder Scrolls and Fallout series.

SureAI has released 6 total full conversion mods, which are all free since they modify pre-existing games. They have also released 1 standalone commercial project, with another set to release in late 2022.

History 
SureAI's first project, Arktwend: The Forgotten Realm, began development in March 2003 as a full conversion mod for The Elder Scrolls III: Morrowind, and SureAI itself was founded in October 2003.

In May 2005, SureAI merged with another modding team, Black Raven, who were working on their own Morrowind total conversion project called Myar Aranath: Relicts of Kallidar. Myar Aranath released in October of 2005, along with SureAI's official website. Arktwend released in February 2006. Both of these mods (and SureAI's other full conversion mods for The Elder Scrolls games) are set in the fictional world of Vyn.

Shortly after releasing Arktwend, SureAI began work on their next project, a full conversion mod for The Elder Scrolls IV: Oblivion called Nehrim: At Fate's Edge.

In May 2009, SureAI released Cube Experimental, a mod for Fallout 3.

Nehrim: At Fate's Edge was released in 2010. Mod DB selected SureAI as one of the best modding teams of 2010 for Nehrim: At Fate's Edge. SureAI won PC Gamer's mod of the year award for Nehrim, which was also a contestant for best role-playing video game.

In June 2012 SureAI announced a new total conversion for The Elder Scrolls V: Skyrim, called Enderal: The Shards of Order. Enderal was SureAI's first mod to include both English and German voice acting. It was released in German on 2 July 2016 and in English on 13 August 2016.

In September 2018, SureAI released their first commercial game: Mad Restaurant People, a casual restaurant management game. SureAI also began work on a yet unannounced project later in 2018.

In February 2019, Enderal was reissued via the Steam store with its new addon, Forgotten Stories. Forgotten Stories restored cut content from the original release, and added new quests and classes. The mod received positive reviews from users. In 2019, SureAI announced they would also be releasing Nehrim to the Steam store for free at a later date, which they did in June 2020. Nehrim's Steam release contains achievements, as well as new patches to improve the mod.

In January 2021 SureAI announced they were working on a new commercial game. In March 2021, a community-made port of Enderal to Skyrim Special Edition was released on Steam, featuring improved visuals and technical performance on account of the updated Skyrim engine.

In July 2022, SureAI revealed their upcoming commercial project: Dreadful River, a roguelike adventure game which is set to be released in early 2023 on Steam Early Access.

Mods

Games

References

External links

2003 establishments
2003 establishments in Germany
Video game companies of Germany